Norm Peach is an American bassist from Utica, New York who was a member of Earthstar during the late 1970s.  He also played with Dennis Rea and Daniel Zongrone in Zuir prior to joining Earthstar.  He appeared on two Earthstar albums: Salterbarty Tales (1978) and ''French Skyline (1979).

Notes

References
Album liner notes
Discogs Norm Peach  Retrieved October 28, 2007.

American bass guitarists
Earthstar (band) members
Living people
Guitarists from New York (state)
Year of birth missing (living people)